William Ray Engvall Jr. (born July 27, 1957) is an American retired stand-up comedian, actor, and television host. Engvall has released a number of stand-up comedy albums through Warner Records and the defunct BNA Records. His most commercially successful album is his 1996 debut Here's Your Sign, certified platinum by the Recording Industry Association of America. The album derives its name from Engvall's signature routine "here's your sign", wherein he offers "signs" to people whom he deems lacking in intellect. He has toured as a comedian both by himself and as a member of Blue Collar Comedy Tour, which included Jeff Foxworthy, Larry the Cable Guy, and Ron White. Engvall's television roles include Delta, The Jeff Foxworthy Show, The Bill Engvall Show, and Lingo.

Early life
William Ray Engvall Jr. was born in Galveston, Texas on July 27, 1957. His father, William Ray Engvall Sr., was a U.S. Navy doctor, who then went into private practice. Engvall spent most of his childhood living first in Galveston, then in Winslow, Arizona, then moving back to near Dallas, Texas during middle school. Following graduation from Richardson High School in Richardson, Texas, where he chose trombone when the teacher gave him the choice of either that or the tuba which led him into the jazz marching band, Engvall attended Southwestern University in Georgetown, Texas, intending to earn a bachelor's degree and become a teacher. While at Southwestern he was a member of Xi Chapter of the Kappa Alpha Order. Engvall left college without graduating and worked a series of jobs, including tour guide at Inner Space Caverns, and disc jockey in a Dallas, Texas nightclub. It was while working as the club DJ that he first ventured into stand-up comedy at amateur and open mic nights around Dallas.

Career
In 1990, Bill Engvall moved to Southern California to dedicate full-time to comedy. Early notoriety came from hosting the cable show A Pair of Jokers with Rosie O'Donnell and an appearance on The Golden Palace where he played Blanche's son Matthew, a stockbroker turned aspiring comic. Other early appearances included hosting A&E Networks An Evening at The Improv as well as stand-up routines on The Tonight Show Starring Johnny Carson and the Late Show with David Letterman.

A career breakthrough happened in 1992 when Engvall was named Best Male Standup at the American Comedy Awards. His first role as a series regular came soon after when he was cast in the ABC series Delta, starring Delta Burke. However, the show only lasted one season and Engvall returned to making the rounds of comedy clubs and the occasional television appearance until 1996 when he was cast with fellow comic and best friend Jeff Foxworthy in the NBC version of The Jeff Foxworthy Show. Signed by Warner Records in 1996, Engvall released the first of a series of successful comedy albums, Here's Your Sign, based on his signature joke. The album was certified Platinum and peaked at number 5 on the Billboard Country album chart. Excerpts from this album were remixed into a musical track titled "Here's Your Sign (Get the Picture)", featuring a chorus sung by country music artist Travis Tritt. "Here's Your Sign (Get the Picture)" charted at number 29 on Billboard Hot Country Songs and number 43 on the Billboard Hot 100 in 1997. Engvall released two more albums by the end of the 1990s: Dorkfish in 1998 and Here's Your Christmas Album in 1999. The latter featured narrations by Engvall, as well as songs he co-wrote sung by session musicians. One of these original compositions, "Here's Your Sign Christmas", also made the country charts in both 1998 and 1999.

In 2000, Engvall exited Warner Records for BNA Records, citing managerial changes at Warner. His only BNA album, Now That's Awesome, came out that same year. Like most of the albums before it, this included two tracks that interpolated stand-up lines from the album with a musical track. The title track featured guest vocals from T. Graham Brown, Tracy Byrd, and Neal McCoy, while "Shoulda Shut Up" featured Julie Reeves.

Engvall moved back to Warner for all subsequent albums. Cheap Drunk: An Autobiography in 2002, Here's Your Sign Reloaded in 2003, 15° Off Cool in 2007, and Aged and Confused in 2009.

In 2021, Engvall announced his intention to retire from stand-up comedy after his "Here's Your Sign, It's Finally Time" farewell tour. He posted a video on YouTube confirming his retirement on December 30, 2022. His final performance was at the Eccles Theater in Salt Lake City the following day.

Blue Collar Comedy Tour

In 2000, Jeff Foxworthy and Engvall launched the first of six Blue Collar Comedy Tours. The tours also featured Ron White and Larry the Cable Guy and were largely responsible for their breakout success. Each of the six years of the tour was very successful and spawned three films, a satellite radio show, and a television series titled Blue Collar TV on The WB Network.

The Bill Engvall Show

In 2007, Engvall starred in his own sitcom where he played himself as a family counselor. The show lasted three seasons.

Game show host
On June 6, 2011, Engvall took over as host of Lingo on Game Show Network. According to an interview in American Profile magazine, Engvall said that he jumped at the chance to host the show, citing the fun that his friend Foxworthy had hosting Are You Smarter Than a 5th Grader? Engvall had been a fan of Lingo when it aired a few years previously before ending in 2007, admitting that his wife always beat him to the answers. When asked if there were any plans to have buddies Foxworthy or Larry the Cable Guy appear on Lingo, he replied, "You never know! I would love to have them on the show because it would be a blast. I would really dig that."

Dancing with the Stars
In 2013, Engvall was announced as a contestant on the 17th season of Dancing with the Stars paired with professional dancer Emma Slater. In the first week, he danced the Foxtrot and received a score of 18. The second week was Latin week and he saw some higher scores from the judges receiving a 21 for his Jive. And the third week of competition, Bill saw his highest score of 24 with a Paso Doble to the Lone Ranger theme song. Throughout the rest of the show, the judges usually placed Engvall and Slater at the bottom of the leaderboard, but an enormous fan base kept them in the competition, resulting in higher-scoring contestants, e.g. Christina Milian, Snooki, Brant Daugherty, Elizabeth Berkley, and Leah Remini being voted out instead.

On November 18, Engvall and Slater made it to the finals, along with Amber Riley, Jack Osbourne and Corbin Bleu. The two finished in fourth place.

Comedic style
Engvall's most well-known routine is "here's your sign". In this routine, he offers "signs" to people whom he considers lacking in intellect. These jokes typically take the form of another person asking Engvall a "stupid question", to which Engvall typically responds with a sarcastic response before telling the person "here's your sign". Other jokes in Engvall's routine include anecdotes about his life as a father and husband, typically in the form of self-deprecation.

Personal life
Bill and Gail Engvall (born August 5, 1960) have been married since December 18, 1982. They have a daughter named Emily (born June 9, 1986), a 2008 graduate from the University of Puget Sound, as well as a son, Travis (born June 25, 1991), a 2015 graduate from Northern Arizona University; both of whom are often mentioned during his routines. Engvall resides in Utah when not on tour and maintains a blog for the Los Angeles Angels on the website of Fox Sports West.Main page of Bill Engvall's LAA Blog FoxSportsWest.com. Retrieved September 30, 2013 Engvall is an ordained minister. He graduated with a degree in Christian Studies from Grand Canyon University in 2021.

Discography

Albums

Notes
 A ^ Here's Your Sign also peaked at number 3 on Top Heatseekers.
 B ^ Here's Your Christmas Album also peaked at number 33 on Top Holiday Albums. It was re-released in 2005.
 C ^ A Decade of Laughs was the second number 1 album upon the 2004 debut of the Billboard "Top Comedy Albums" chart, after Lord, I Apologize by fellow Blue Collar Comedy star Larry the Cable Guy.

Singles

Other charted songs

Music videos

List of works

Bibliography
 Just a Guy: Notes from a Blue Collar Life'', St. Martin's Press 2007,

Filmography

References

External links

 
 
 Bill Engvall cast bio on The WB

 

1957 births
Living people
American country singer-songwriters
American male film actors
American game show hosts
American stand-up comedians
American male television actors
Southwestern University alumni
Warner Records artists
People from Galveston, Texas
Participants in American reality television series
21st-century American male actors
Male actors from Texas
Singer-songwriters from Texas
American people of Swedish descent
20th-century American comedians
21st-century American comedians
Comedians from Texas
Country musicians from Texas